Leopoldina Fortunati (born 18 July 1949) is an Italian feminist, theorist, and author. Her influences include Mariarosa Dalla Costa, Antonio Negri, and Karl Marx.

Work
She is the author of The Arcane of Reproduction: Housework, Prostitution, Labor and Capital (L'arcano della riproduzione: Casalinghe, prostitute, operai e capitale), a feminist critique of Marx.

Leopoldina Fortunati teaches Sociology of Communication and Sociology of Cultural Processes at the Faculty of Education of the University of Udine, Italy. She has conducted extensive research in the field of gender studies, cultural processes and communication and information technologies.

Fortunati is the author of several books, including The Arcane of Reproduction (Autonomedia, 1995) and I mostri nell’immaginario (Angeli, 1995), and is the editor of Gli Italiani al telefono (Angeli, 1995) and Telecomunicando in Europa (1998), and with J. Katz and R. Riccini Mediating the Human Body. Technology, Communication and Fashion (2003). She has published many articles in journals such as The Information Society, Information, Communication, Society, Réseaux, Trends in communication, Revista de Estudios de Juventud, Widerspruche, Personal and Ubiquitous computing, Gazette. The International Journal for Communication Studies, Sociologia dell'informazione, and Problemi dell'informazione. Her works have been published in nine languages: Chinese, English, French, German, Italian, Japanese, Korean, Russian, and Spanish.

She is the founding volume editor for the Human-Machine Communication journal, an associate editor of the journal The Information Society, is in the advisory board of the journal New Media and Society, and serves as referee for the journal Communication, Information, Society and Journal for the Theory of Social Behaviour. She represents Italy in the COST Technical Committee for Social Sciences and Humanities and in the action COST A20 "The Impact of Internet on the Mass Media in Europe". She was part of the European research project SIGIS "Strategies of Inclusion: Gender and the Information Society" and of COST248 "The Future European Telecommunications User" and she was the vice-chairperson of COST269 "User Aspects of ICTs". She is the co-chair of the International Association "The Society for the Social Study of Mobile Communication" (SSSMC) which intends to facilitate the international advancement of cross-disciplinary mobile communication studies. She organised several international workshops and conferences.

Bibliography
 Leopoldina Fortunati, The Arcane of Reproduction: Housework, Prostitution, Labor and Capital (New York: Autonomedia, 1996).
 Leopoldina Fortunati, "Learning to Struggle: My Story Between Workerism and Feminism", Viewpoint Magazine 3 (September 2013).

References

Further reading
 Maya Gonzales, "The Gendered Circuit: Reading The Arcane of Reproduction", Viewpoint Magazine 3 (September 2013).

External links
Personal web page, University of Udine

Autonomism
Italian women writers
Italian feminists
Italian sociologists
Italian women sociologists
Living people
1949 births